Hold on Now, Youngster... is the debut studio album by Welsh indie pop band Los Campesinos!, released through Wichita on 22 February 2008. It debuted at number 72 on the UK Album Charts. The album was preceded by three singles – "Death to Los Campesinos!" (February), "My Year in Lists" (May), and most notably, "You! Me! Dancing!" released in June 2007.

A deluxe remastered tenth anniversary edition of the album with bonus tracks was released on 12 October 2018.

Release
The original album contains 12 tracks, despite only being 11 listed on physical versions. "2007: The Year Punk Broke (My Heart)" is an unlisted track on the CD release, and as a C-side on the double gatefold vinyl.

On 3 July 2007, "You! Me! Dancing!" was released as part of the Sticking Fingers Into Sockets EP. A rerecorded, slightly longer version of the track appears on Hold on Now, Youngster..., and was promoted as the album's lead single. The song appeared at number 72 on Rolling Stones list of the 100 Best Songs of 2007. The track appeared on a Budweiser television advert in 2010.

Two more singles – "Death to Los Campesinos!" and "My Year in Lists", were released before the album became available on 22 February 2008. The latter was formerly part of the band's four-track My Year in Lists single.

Reception
Initial critical response was very positive. Metacritic gave the album an average score of 81 based on 29 mainstream critic reviews, asserting "universal acclaim".

Marc Hogan of Pitchfork called the debut "unusually taut and polished, with hooks, crescendos, and clever turns of phrase nearly always in the right place", citing "Sweet Dreams, Sweet Cheeks" as the album's highlight. Dave Simpson of the Guardian, in a four star review, wrote the album was "impeccably arranged and sharply constructed, and showered in xylophones and violins".

Track listing

Personnel

Musicians 
Los Campesinos!

 Gareth Paisey – writing, vocals, glockenspiel
 Neil Beale – writing, guitar
 Tom Bromley – writing, keyboard, guitar, backing vocals
 Ellen Waddell – writing, bass, backing vocals
 Aleksandra Berditchevskaia – writing, backing vocals, keyboard
 Ollie Briggs – writing, drums
 Harriet Coleman – writing, violin, keyboards, string arrangements, backing vocals

Technical 

 David Newfeld – recording (1, 2-9, 10-12, 14, 17, 19)
 John Goodmanson – mixing (1, 2, 4-8, 10-12, 17)
 Simon Francis – mastering
 Steve Davis – recording, mixing (18, 20, 22)
 Luke Jones – recording, mixing (15, 23)

Release history

Notes
 On the vinyl version of the album, the black disc (containing the 11 album tracks) should be played at 33⅓ RPM, whereas the orange disc, with bonus track "2007..." on it, should be played at 45 RPM.

Charts

References

2008 debut albums
Los Campesinos! albums
Arts & Crafts Productions albums
Wichita Recordings albums